Paul Edward Stamets (born July 17, 1955) is an American mycologist and entrepreneur who sells various mushroom products through his company. He is an author and advocate of medicinal fungi and mycoremediation.

Early life
Stamets was born in Salem, Ohio. He grew up in Columbiana, Ohio with an older brother, John, older brother, Bill, an older sister, Lilly, his twin brother North, and younger siblings. He graduated from The Evergreen State College in Olympia, Washington with a bachelor's degree in 1979. He began his career in the forest as a logger. He has an honorary doctorate from the National University of Natural Medicine in Portland.

Personal life
Stamets is married to Carolyn "Dusty" Yao.

Mycological interest
Stamets credits his late brother, John, with stimulating his interest in mycology,  and studied mycology as an undergraduate student. Having no academic training higher than a bachelor's degree, Stamets is largely self-taught in the field of mycology.

Paul Stamets received an Invention Ambassador (2014–2015) award from the American Association for the Advancement of Science (AAAS).

In popular culture 
Stamets plays a significant part in the 2019 documentary film Fantastic Fungi, and edited the film’s official companion book, Fantastic Fungi: Expanding Consciousness, Alternative Healing, Environmental Impact 

The character Lieutenant Commander Paul Stamets on the CBS series Star Trek: Discovery was named after the real Stamets. The fictional version is an astromycologist and engineer aboard the USS Discovery, and is credited with discovering how to navigate a mycelial network in space using a "spore drive".

Books 
 Psilocybe Mushrooms & Their Allies (1978), Homestead Book Company, 
 The Mushroom Cultivator: A Practical Guide to Growing Mushrooms at Home (1984), Paul Stamets and J Chilton, Agarikon Press, 
 Growing Gourmet and Medicinal Mushrooms (1996), Ten Speed Press, 
 Psilocybin Mushrooms of the World (1996), Ten Speed Press, 
Mycelium Running: How Mushrooms Can Help Save the World (2005), Ten Speed Press)
Fantastic Fungi: How Mushrooms Can Heal, Shift Consciousness & Save the Planet (2019), Earth Aware Editions,

References

External links

Profile at his business website, Fungi Perfecti

1955 births
Living people
American mycologists
American science writers
American environmentalists
Evergreen State College alumni
Permaculturalists
Psychedelic drug researchers
American psychedelic drug advocates
People from Shelton, Washington
People from Columbiana, Ohio